Szkolny Klub Sportowy Gwarek Zabrze is a Polish football club based in Zabrze, focusing on youth development.

History
The club was established on 12 June 1974, inspired by the successes of the local club Górnik Zabrze in the 1970s. With the work of several local famous players and coaches within the local schools it was decided that a youth system should be implemented serving as feeder to Górnik Zabrze. The club are three-time youth champions of Poland, in 2002, 2003 and 2006. Besides the youth development teams, the club has had a senior team playing in the amateur divisions.

Honours
Polish U-19 Champions (x2) – 2006, 2003
Polish U-19 Runners-Up (x) – 1988, 1994, 1996, 1999, 2004
Polish U-17 Champions (x1) – 2002

Players
Among most notable players who began their careers at Gwarek, or were spotted by Gwarek's scouts and purchased by the club in their teens, are Tomasz Cywka, Adam Danch, Dawid Jarka, Kamil Kosowski, Marcin Kuźba, Piotr Gierczak, Łukasz Piszczek, Tomasz Bandrowski, Przemysław Trytko.

References

External links
 Official page (Polish)
 90minut.pl profile (Polish)

Football clubs in Silesian Voivodeship
Zabrze
Association football clubs established in 1974
1974 establishments in Poland